Gary R. Alexander (born November 1, 1969) is an American former professional basketball player.

A 6' 7" forward born in Jacksonville, Florida, Alexander played at William M. Raines High School and the University of South Florida before having an 11-game stint in the National Basketball Association. He played for the Miami Heat and Cleveland Cavaliers during the 1993–94 season.

In 1992–93 he was the top rebounder in the Israel Basketball Premier League.

Alexander retired from basketball. He stated that basketball had served its purpose for him.

References

External links
Career statistics

1969 births
Living people
American expatriate basketball people in France
American expatriate basketball people in Germany
American expatriate basketball people in Israel
American expatriate basketball people in Italy
American expatriate basketball people in Poland
American expatriate basketball people in Spain
American expatriate basketball people in Turkey
American expatriate basketball people in Venezuela
Basketball players from Jacksonville, Florida
BCM Gravelines players
Beşiktaş men's basketball players
CB Breogán players
CB Estudiantes players
CB Gran Canaria players
Chorale Roanne Basket players
Cleveland Cavaliers players
Forwards (basketball)
Gaiteros del Zulia players
Israeli Basketball Premier League players
Liga ACB players
Maccabi Haifa B.C. players
Miami Heat players
Asseco Gdynia players
SIG Basket players
South Florida Bulls men's basketball players
STB Le Havre players
Undrafted National Basketball Association players
American men's basketball players